Middle Quarters is a settlement in Saint Elizabeth Parish in Jamaica.

References 

Populated places in Saint Elizabeth Parish